Queen of the Boulevards (German: Glanz und Elend der Kurtisanen) is a 1927 German silent drama film directed by Manfred Noa and starring Paul Wegener, Andrée Lafayette and Werner Fuetterer. It is based on the novel Splendeurs et misères des courtisanes by Honoré de Balzac. It was shot at the Staaken Studios in Berlin, and distributed by the Munich-based Bavaria Film. Art direction was by Otto Erdmann and Hans Sohnle.

Cast
 Paul Wegener as Collin / Marquis de Herrera  
 Andrée Lafayette as Renée 
 Werner Fuetterer as Lucien  
 Nien Soen Ling as Paccard  
 Kurt Gerron as Niccinger  
 Helen von Münchofen as Coralie 
 Eugen Burg as Grad-lieu 
 Elly Leffler 
 Ferdinand von Alten as Serizy

References

Bibliography
 Bock, Hans-Michael & Bergfelder, Tim. The Concise CineGraph. Encyclopedia of German Cinema. Berghahn Books, 2009.

External links

1927 films
Films of the Weimar Republic
Films directed by Manfred Noa
German silent feature films
Films based on works by Honoré de Balzac
Bavaria Film films
1927 drama films
German drama films
German black-and-white films
Silent drama films
Films shot at Staaken Studios
1920s German films